Solenogyne is a genus of Australian plants in the tribe Astereae within the family Asteraceae.

 Species
 Solenogyne bellioides Cass. - New South Wales, Queensland
 Solenogyne dominii L.G.Adams - New South Wales, South Australia, Tasmania, Victoria; naturalized in New Zealand
 Solenogyne gunnii (Hook.f.) Cabrera - New South Wales, Tasmania, Victoria; naturalized in New Zealand

 formerly included
see Lagenophora 
 Solenogyne mikadoi - Lagenophora mikadoi

References

Asteraceae genera
Astereae
Endemic flora of Australia